NMath is a numerical package for the Microsoft .NET Framework. It is developed by CenterSpace Software. Version 1.0 was released in March, 2003 as NMath Core. The current version is called NMath 7.1, released in December, 2019.

NMath is built on MKL, a numerical library from Intel.

Features
NMath contains vector and matrix classes, complex numbers, factorizations, decompositions, linear programming, minimization, root-finding, structured and sparse matrix, least squares, polynomials, simulated annealing, curve fitting, numerical integration and differentiationing.

See also
 Comparison of numerical-analysis software
 List of numerical-analysis software

References

External links
 CenterSpace Software

.NET programming tools
C Sharp libraries
C Sharp software
Component-based software engineering
Econometrics software
Mathematical optimization software
Numerical software
Programming tools for Windows
Windows-only software